Shōgun is a 1980 American historical drama television miniseries based on James Clavell's 1975 novel of the same name. The series was produced by Paramount Television and first broadcast in the United States on NBC over five nights between September 15 and September 19, 1980. It was written by Eric Bercovici and directed by Jerry London, and stars Richard Chamberlain, Toshiro Mifune, and Yoko Shimada, with a large supporting cast. Clavell served as executive producer. , it is the only American television production to be filmed on-location entirely in Japan, with additional soundstage filming also taking place in Japan at the Toho studio.

The miniseries is loosely based on the adventures of English navigator William Adams, who journeyed to Japan in 1600 and rose to high rank in the service of the shōgun. It follows fictional Englishman John Blackthorne's (Chamberlain) transforming experiences and political intrigues in feudal Japan in the early 17th century.

Shōgun received generally positive reviews from critics and won several accolades, including the Primetime Emmy Award for Outstanding Limited Series, the Golden Globe Award for Best Television Series – Drama, and a 1981 Peabody Award. A remake series is set to be broadcast by FX in 2023.

Plot

After his Dutch trading ship Erasmus and its surviving crew is blown ashore by a violent storm at Anjiro on the east coast of Japan, Pilot-Major John Blackthorne, the ship's English navigator, is taken prisoner by samurai warriors. When he is later temporarily released, he must relinquish his English identity, while adapting to the alien Japanese culture in order to survive. Being an Englishman, Blackthorne is at both religious and political odds with his enemy, the Portuguese traders, and the Catholic Church's Jesuit order. The Catholic foothold in Japan puts Blackthorne, a Protestant and therefore a heretic, at a political disadvantage. This same situation, however, also brings him under the scrutiny of the influential Lord Toranaga, who mistrusts this foreign religion now spreading throughout Japan. He is competing with other samurai warlords of similar high-born rank, among them Catholic converts, for the very powerful position of shōgun, the military governor of Japan.

Through an interpreter, Blackthorne later reveals certain surprising details about the Portuguese traders and their Jesuit overlords, forcing Toranaga to trust him; they forge a tenuous alliance, much to the chagrin of the Jesuits. To help the Englishman learn their language and to assimilate to Japanese culture, Toranaga assigns a teacher and interpreter to him, the beautiful Lady Mariko, a Catholic convert and one of Toranaga's most trusted retainers. Blackthorne soon becomes infatuated with her, but Mariko is already married, and their budding romance is ultimately doomed by future circumstances. Blackthorn also ends up saving the life of a Portuguese counterpart, Pilot Vasco Rodrigues, who becomes his friend despite their being on opposite sides.

Blackthorne saves Toranaga's life by audaciously helping him escape from Osaka Castle and the clutches of his longtime enemy, Lord Ishido. To reward the Englishman, and to forever bind him to his service, Toranaga makes Blackthorne hatamoto, a personal retainer, and gifts him with a European flintlock pistol. Later, Blackthorne again saves Toranaga's life during an earthquake by pulling him from a fissure that opened and swallowed the warlord, nearly killing him. Having proved his worth and loyalty to the warlord, during a night ceremony held before a host of his assembled vassals and samurai, Lord Toranaga makes Blackthorne a samurai; he awards him the two swords, 20 kimono, 200 of his own samurai, and an income-producing fief, the fishing village Anjiro, where Blackthorne was first blown ashore with his ship and crew. Blackthorne's repaired ship Erasmus, under guard by Toranaga's samurai and anchored near Kyoto, is lost to a fire, which quickly spread when the ships' night lamps are knocked over by a storm tidal surge. During a later attack on Osaka Castle by the secretive Amida Tong (ninja assassins), secretly paid for by Lord Ishido, Mariko is killed while saving Blackthorne's life, who is temporarily blinded by the black powder explosion that kills her. Lord Yabu is forced to commit seppuku for his involvement with the ninja attack, into which he was coerced by Ishido. Right before he dies, Yabu gives Blackthorne his katana, and Yabu's nephew, Omi, becomes the daimyō of Izu.

Blackthorne supervises the construction of a new ship, The Lady, using funds Mariko left to him in her will for this very purpose. Blackthorne is observed at a distance by Lord Toranaga; in a voice-over he reveals his inner thoughts, observing that Blackthorne still has much to teach him. It was Toranaga who ordered the Erasmus destroyed by fire to keep Blackthorne safe from his Portuguese enemies, who feared his hostile actions with the ship (and, if need be, the warlord will also destroy the new ship Blackthorne is currently building). He also discloses Mariko's secret but vital role in the grand deception of his enemies, and, as a result, how she was destined to die, helping to assure his coming final victory. The warlord knows that Blackthorne's karma brought him to Japan and that the Englishman, now his trusted retainer and samurai, is destined never to leave. Toranaga also knows it is his karma to become shōgun.

In a voice-over epilogue, it is revealed that Toranaga and his army are triumphant at the Battle of Sekigahara; he captures and then disgraces his old rival, Lord Ishido, burying him up to his neck to die slowly. The narrator concludes that when the Emperor of Japan offered Toranaga the position of shōgun, he "reluctantly agreed".

Cast

Only three of the Japanese actors spoke English in the entire production: Shimada, Obayashi, and Okada. At the time of filming, Shimada knew very little English, and heavily relied on her dialogue coach to deliver her lines phonetically. The English words that she could not pronounce were substituted or overdubbed in post-production.

Episodes

Production
Clavell and NBC wanted Sean Connery to play Blackthorne, but Connery reportedly laughed at the idea of working for months in Japan, as he had disliked filming You Only Live Twice there. According to the documentary The Making of Shōgun, other actors considered for the role included Roger Moore and Albert Finney.

Clavell said he was originally opposed to Richard Chamberlain's casting, wanting Albert Finney. However he was extremely happy with Chamberlain's performance: "He's marvelous", said Clavell.

Reception 
Shōgun was produced after the success of the television miniseries Roots (1977) that had aired on the ABC Network in 1977. The success of Roots, as well as Jesus of Nazareth (1977), resulted in many other miniseries during the 1980s. Shōgun, which first aired in 1980, also became a highly rated program and continued the wave of miniseries over the next few years (such as North and South and The Thorn Birds) as networks clamored to capitalize on the format's success.

NBC had the highest weekly Nielsen ratings in its history with Shōgun. Its 26.3 average rating was the second highest in television history after ABC's with Roots. An average of 32.9% of all television households watched at least part of the series. The miniseries' success was credited with causing the mass-market paperback edition of Clavell's novel to become the best-selling paperback in the United States, with 2.1 million copies in print during 1980, and increased awareness of Japanese culture in America. In the documentary The Making of 'Shōgun''' it is stated that the rise of Japanese food establishments in the United States (particularly sushi houses) is attributed to Shōgun. It was also noted that during the week of broadcast, many restaurants and movie houses saw a decrease in business. The documentary states many stayed home to watch Shōgun—unprecedented for a television broadcast. (The home VCR was not yet ubiquitous and still expensive in 1980.)

The Japanese characters speak in Japanese throughout, except when translating for Blackthorne; the original broadcast did not use subtitles for the Japanese dialog. As the movie was presented from Blackthorne's point of view, the producers felt that "what he doesn't understand, we [shouldn't] understand".

The website Rotten Tomatoes gives the series an aggregate critic rating of 80%.

Sexuality and violenceShōgun broke several broadcast taboos and contained several firsts for American television.
 It was the first network show allowed to use the word "piss" in dialogue and actually to show the act of urination. As a symbolic act of Blackthorne's subservience to the Japanese ruling class and to punish him for saying "I piss on you and your country", Blackthorne is urinated upon by a samurai.
 In the first episode, Blackthorne's stranded shipmates are to be suspended in a cargo net into a boiling vat of soy sauce and water; one of them, Pieterzoon, is killed that way until Blackthorne acquiesces to the Japanese nobility.
 A man is shown beheaded early in the first chapter, another first for network TV (although the film version of the sequence was more bloody).
 Men are shown wearing fundoshi.
 Mariko is shown naked in a bath scene, and when Blackthorne is reunited with his men, a woman's breast is visible.
 Shōgun was also noted for its frank discussion of sexuality (e.g., pederasty), and matters such as Japanese ritual suicide (seppuku).

Reception in Japan
The miniseries was reported to have been negatively received in Japan, where it was broadcast in 1981 on TV Asahi, as the series' fictionalization of events in the 16th century seemed frivolous and trivial. Many Japanese viewers were already accustomed to historical drama series such as NHK's annual taiga dramas, which were considered more faithful towards the history they are depicting than the miniseries.

Theatrical release
In Japan, Shōgun was cut to a 159-minute version and released theatrically on November 9, 1980. Stuart Galbraith IV described this version of the film as "fatally cut to ribbons". It was later restored to its full length for a home video release in Japan.

A heavily truncated 125-minute edit of the miniseries was released in 1980 to European theatrical film markets. This was also the first version of Shōgun to be released to the North American home video market (a release of the full miniseries did not occur until later). The theatrical version contains additional violence and nudity that had been removed from the NBC broadcast version.

DVD release
The DVD release has no episode breaks and is divided over 4 discs, with bonus features on disc 5.
 DVD release: September 30, 2003
 Feature length: 547 minutes
 Extras: 13-segment documentary on the making of Shōgun (79:24); Historical Featurettes – The Samurai (5:34), Tea Ceremony (4:35), and Geisha (4:56); audio commentary by Director Jerry London on 7 selected scenes

The 125-minute version has yet to be released on DVD or Blu-ray.

Blu-ray release
CBS Home Entertainment's Blu-ray release of Shōgun on three discs was on July 22, 2014, and featured a 1080p remastered video presentation, a DTS-HD Master Audio 5.1 surround sound mix, and a restored Dolby Digital mono track; the special features are exactly the same as on the original 2003 DVD release.

Syndicated version
A version of the miniseries edited into one-hour episodes has been broadcast in North America.

Accolades
 1981 Peabody Award
 1981 Golden Globe, won:
 Best TV-Series – Drama
 Best Performance by an Actor in a TV-Series – Drama: Richard Chamberlain
 Best Performance by an Actress in a TV-Series – Drama: Yôko Shimada
 1981 nominated American Cinema Editors "Eddie" Award, Best Edited Episode from a Television Mini-Series (episode 1): James T. Heckert, Bill Luciano, Donald R. Rode, Benjamin A. Weissman, Jerry Young
 1981 Emmy, won:
 Outstanding Limited Series: James Clavell (executive producer), Eric Bercovici (producer)
 Outstanding Costume Design for a Series (episode 5): Shin Nishida
 Outstanding Graphic Design and Title Sequences (episode 1): Phill Norman (graphic designer)
 1981 Emmy, nominated:
 Outstanding Lead Actor in a Limited Series or a Special: Richard Chamberlain
 Outstanding Lead Actor in a Limited Series or a Special: Toshiro Mifune
 Outstanding Lead Actress in a Limited Series or a Special: Yôko Shimada
 Outstanding Supporting Actor in a Limited Series or a Special: John Rhys-Davies
 Outstanding Supporting Actor in a Limited Series or a Special: Yuki Meguro
 Outstanding Achievement in Film Sound Editing (episode 3): Stanley Paul (supervising sound editor), William Andrews (sound editor), Leonard Corso (sound editor), Denis Dutton (sound editor), Jack A. Finlay (sound editor), Robert Gutknecht (sound editor), Sean Hanley (sound editor), Pierre Jalbert (sound editor), Jack Keath (sound editor), Alan L. Nineberg (sound editor), Lee Osborne (sound editor), Tally Paulos (sound editor)
 Outstanding Art Direction for a Limited Series or a Special (episode 5): Joseph R. Jennings (production designer), Yoshinobu Nishioka (art director), Tom Pedigo (set decorator), Shoichi Yasuda (set decorator)
 Outstanding Cinematography for a Limited Series or a Special (episode 4): Andrew Laszlo
 Outstanding Directing in a Limited Series or a Special (episode 5): Jerry London
 Outstanding Film Editing for a Limited Series or a Special (episode 5): Donald R. Rode, Benjamin A. Weissman, Jerry Young, Bill Luciano
 Outstanding Writing in a Limited Series or a Special (episode 5): Eric Bercovici (writer)

See also
 List of historical drama films of Asia
 Tokugawa Ieyasu, 1983 taiga drama about the life of Ieyasu, the basis for Lord Toranaga, aired two years after Shōgun''s Japan release.

References

Footnotes

Sources

External links
 
 

1980 American television series debuts
1980 American television series endings
1980s American television miniseries
1980s Japanese television series
Asian Saga
Best Drama Series Golden Globe winners
Adaptations of works by James Clavell
Films directed by Jerry London
Films scored by Maurice Jarre
Films shot in Japan
Japan in non-Japanese culture
Jidaigeki television series
NBC original programming
Peabody Award-winning television programs
Primetime Emmy Award for Outstanding Miniseries winners
Sengoku period in fiction
Television shows based on American novels
Television shows based on British novels
Television series by CBS Studios
Television series set in the 17th century
Television series set in feudal Japan